The  is a Japanese high-speed rail line that is part of the nationwide Shinkansen network. Along with the Sanyo Shinkansen, it forms a continuous high-speed railway through the Taiheiyō Belt, also known as the Tokaido corridor. Opened in 1964, running between Tokyo and Shin-Ōsaka, it is Japan's first high-speed rail line. Along with being the world's oldest high-speed rail line, it is also one of the most heavily used. Since 1987 it has been operated by the Central Japan Railway Company (JR Central), prior to that by Japanese National Railways (JNR).

There are three types of services on the line: from fastest to slowest, they are the limited-stop Nozomi, the semi-fast Hikari, and the all-stop Kodama. Many Nozomi and Hikari trains continue onward to the San'yō Shinkansen, going as far as Fukuoka's Hakata Station.

The line was named a joint Historic Mechanical Engineering Landmark and IEEE Milestone by the American Society of Mechanical Engineers and the Institute of Electrical and Electronics Engineers in 2000.

History

The predecessor for the Tokaido and Sanyo Shinkansen lines was originally conceived at the end of the 1930s as a standard-gauge dangan ressha (bullet train) between Tokyo and Shimonoseki, which would have taken nine hours to cover the nearly 1,000 kilometer distance between the two cities. This project was planned as the first part of an East Asian rail network serving Japan's overseas territories. The beginning of World War II stalled the project in its early planning stages, although three tunnels were dug that were later used in the Shinkansen route.

By 1955, the original Tokaido line between Tokyo and Osaka was congested. Even after its electrification the next year, the line was still the busiest in Japan's railway network by a long margin, with demand being around double the then capacity. In 1957, a public forum was organized to discuss “The Possibility of a Three-hour Rail Trip Between Tokyo and Osaka.” After substantial debate, the Japanese National Railways (JNR) decided to build a new standard gauge line alongside the original narrow gauge one to supplement it. The president of JNR at the time, Shinji Sogō, started attempting to persuade politicians to back the project. Realizing the high expenses of the project early on due to the use of new, unfamiliar technologies and the high concentration of tunnels and viaducts, Sogō settled for less government funding than what was needed.

The Diet approved the plan in December 1958, agreeing to fund  out of the  required over a five-year construction period. Then-finance minister Eisaku Satō recommended that the rest of the funds should be taken from non-governmental sources so that political changes would not cause funding issues. Construction of the line began on April 20, 1959 under Sogō and chief engineer Hideo Shima. In 1960, Shima and Sogō were sent to the United States to borrow money from the World Bank. Although the original request was for US$200 million, they came back with only $80 million, enough to fund 15% of the project, and could not use the loan for "experimental technology". Severe cost overruns during construction forced both of them to resign. The opening was timed to coincide with the 1964 Summer Olympics in Tokyo, which had already brought international attention to the country. Originally, the line was called the New Tokaido Line in English. Just like the original railway line, it is named after the Tokaido road that has been used for centuries.

Initially, there were two services: the faster Hikari (also called the Super Express) made the journey between Tokyo and Shin-Osaka in four hours, while the slower Kodama (or the limited express) made more stops and took five hours to travel the same route. A test run was conducted August 25, 1964, simulating a Hikari service. The run, which was deemed "very successful" by then-JNR president Reisuke Ishida, was also broadcast on television by NHK. In November 1965, both services had their schedule reworked so that the new timetable listed travel times of 3 hours for the Hikari and 4 hours for the Kodama.

The 1970s were a difficult time for the JNR as local lines built up deficit. Profits from the Tokaido Shinkansen were used to offset the lines which were running at a loss which resulted in a lack of development and faster service over a 15-year period. Labor issues during that time steered away any attention from JNR executives, further complicating the possibility for research initiatives. Despite the deep financial situation throughout the 1970s, the loan from the World Bank made in 1959 was paid back in 1981.

In 1988, one year after the privatization of JNR, the new operating company, JR Central, initiated a project to increase operating speeds through infrastructure improvement and a new train design.

New platforms for Shinkansen services at Shinagawa Station opened in October 2003, accompanied by a major timetable change which increased the number of daily Nozomi services, which was now larger than the number of Hikari trains. Initially, certain Nozomi and Hikari services did not stop at the station, with some skipping either Shinagawa or Shin-Yokohama, and the plurality of services stopping at both. From March 2008 onward, all services stop at both stations. Another station was planned to open in 2012 to serve Rittō, a city between Maibara and Kyoto. Construction started in May 2006, but the project was canceled the next year due to political opposition from the government of the surrounding Shiga Prefecture and the Supreme Court of Japan ruling the  bond that the city had issued to fund construction was illegal and had to be canceled.

The next speedup, which raised the top speed to its current  through the use of improved braking technology, was announced in 2014 and introduced on March 14, 2015, the 23rd anniversary of the last speed raise. Initially, just one service per hour would run at this new speed. After the replacement of the older, slower 700 series with the N700 series in March 2020, a new timetable taking advantage of the speed increase with more services was planned. However, the COVID-19 pandemic further delayed these plans as service was temporarily cut.

Stations and service patterns 

Legend:

Rolling stock

 N700A series 16-car sets, since July 1, 2007 (owned by JR Central and JR West, modified from original N700 series sets)
 N700A series 16-car sets, since February 8, 2013 (owned by JR Central and JR West)
 N700S series 16-car sets, since July 1. 2020 (owned by JR Central)

The last services operated by 700 series sets took place on March 1, 2020, after which all Tokaido Shinkansen services are scheduled to be operated by N700A series or N700S series sets. N700S series sets were then introduced on Tokaido Shinkansen services from July 1, 2020.

Former rolling stock
 0 series 12/16-car sets, October 1, 1964, to September 18,  1999 (owned by JR Central and JR West)
 100 series 16-car sets, October 1, 1985, to September 2003 (owned by JR Central and JR West)
 300 series 16-car sets, March 1992 to March 16, 2012 (owned by JR Central and JR West)
 500 series 16-car sets, November 1997 to February 2010 (owned by JR West)
 700 series 16-car sets,  March 1999 to March 2020 (owned by JR Central and JR West)

Non-revenue-earning types
 923 (Set T4)

Timeline

Classes and onboard services 
All Tokaido Shinkansen trains feature two classes. Green Cars (First Class) offer 2+2 configured seating in all reserved carriages. Ordinary Car features 2+3 configured seating in both reserved and unreserved carriages. On all Shinkansen services vending machines with a limited offering of snacks and drinks are available in certain carriages and a trolley service, offering a more extensive but still limited selection, passes through each car a number of times on each journey. It is common practice in Japan to purchase food prior to boarding trains. Almost all stations sell Bento Boxes (complete meals conveniently boxed) for consumption onboard trains.

As of 2020, reservations are required to take large pieces of luggage on Tokaido Shinkansen trains.

Japan Rail Pass 
The Japan Rail Pass is an option for foreign visitors to Japan. Passes are valid on Kodama and Hikari trains. Hikari trains are identical to Nozomi services other than for their stopping patterns (both operate at the same speed on the mainline - Hikari trains stop at additional stations en-route extending journey times).

Ridership
From 1964 to 2012, the Tokaido Shinkansen line alone carried approximately 5.3 billion passengers. Ridership increased from 61,000 per day in 1964 to 391,000 per day in 2012. By 2016, the route was carrying 452,000 passengers per day on 365 daily services making it one of the busiest high speed railway lines in the world.

Future developments
It was announced in June 2010 that a new shinkansen station in Samukawa, Kanagawa Prefecture was under consideration by JR Central. If constructed, the station would open after the new maglev service begins operations.

Shizuoka Prefecture has long lobbied JR Central for the construction of a station at Shizuoka Airport, which the line passes directly beneath. The railway has so far refused, citing the close distance to the neighbouring Shin-Fuji and Shizuoka stations. If constructed, travel time from the center of Tokyo to the airport would be comparable to that for Tokyo Narita Airport, enabling it to act as a third hub airport for the capital. As the station would be built underneath an active airport, it is expected to open after the new maglev line.

See also
 Chuo Shinkansen, an under construction high speed MagLev line between Tokyo and Nagoya

References

Sources

External links

JR Central website

 
Lines of Central Japan Railway Company
High-speed railway lines in Japan
Railway lines opened in 1964
Standard gauge railways in Japan
1964 establishments in Japan
Transport in Osaka
Transport in Tokyo